Ribatajada is a village and  of Spain located in the province of Cuenca, Castilla–La Mancha, belonging to the municipality of Sotorribas. A former municipality, it became part of the municipality of Sotorribas between 1970 and 1981.

References
Notes 

Citations

Populated places in the Province of Cuenca